Sean P. R. Brown (born November 5, 1976) is a Canadian former professional ice hockey defenceman who played in the National Hockey League (NHL).

Playing career
Brown was drafted late in the first round, 21st overall, in the 1995 NHL Entry Draft by the Boston Bruins following a successful career in the Ontario Hockey League as a defenceman with the Belleville Bulls and the Sarnia Sting.  Less than a year later, he was dealt, along with Mariusz Czerkawski and a first-round draft choice to the Edmonton Oilers for Bill Ranford. Brown played parts of six seasons for the Oilers.

In March 2002, Brown was dealt back to Boston to provide defensive depth for a playoff run that never materialized.  Going the other way in the trade was marginal defensive prospect Bobby Allen.  After one more season with the Bruins, he was signed as an unrestricted free agent by the New Jersey Devils, and he has played for them and their American Hockey League affiliate, the Albany River Rats.

On March 9, 2006, Brown was dealt by the Devils to the Vancouver Canucks in exchange for a fourth-round draft pick. He featured in 12 games with the Canucks to conclude his NHL career.

He signed a contract with the Düsseldorf Metro Stars of the DEL on July 27, 2006. In summer 2007, the Nurnberg Ice Tigers, also of the DEL German League, signed Brown away from the Metro Stars. In March 2008, Brown was signed by EC KAC of the Austrian Hockey League.

Career statistics

Awards and honours

References

External links

1976 births
Living people
Albany River Rats players
Belleville Bulls players
Black Canadian ice hockey players
Boston Bruins draft picks
Boston Bruins players
Canadian ice hockey defencemen
DEG Metro Stars players
Edmonton Oilers players
Hamilton Bulldogs (AHL) players
EC KAC players
Sportspeople from Oshawa
National Hockey League first-round draft picks
New Jersey Devils players
Phoenix Roadrunners (IHL) players
Sarnia Sting players
Sinupret Ice Tigers players
Vancouver Canucks players
Canadian expatriate ice hockey players in Austria
Canadian expatriate ice hockey players in Germany